Renmin Road Subdistrict  is a subdistrict situated in Qindu District, Xianyang, Shaanxi, China. , it administers the following thirteen residential neighborhoods:
Leyubei Road Community
Leyunan Road Community
Jiahui Community
Tianwang First Community
Eryin Community
Weiyang Road North Community
Weiyang Road South Community
Fangji Community
Ermian Community
Shengli Street Community
Zhonghong Community
Tuanjiebei Road Community
Youyibei Road Community

See also
List of township-level divisions of Shaanxi

References

Township-level divisions of Shaanxi
Xianyang
Subdistricts of the People's Republic of China